Stara Rokitnia  is a village in the administrative district of Gmina Stężyca, within Ryki County, Lublin Voivodeship, in eastern Poland.

The village has an approximate population of 500.

References

Stara Rokitnia